Channing Pollock may refer to:
 Channing Pollock (writer) (1880–1946), American playwright and critic
 Channing Pollock (magician) (1926–2006), American magician and actor

See also
 Pollock (surname)